Jan Ekels the Elder (1724–1781) was a Dutch painter and a pupil of Dirk Dalens, the younger. He was born and died in  Amsterdam.

He painted views of cities in the manner of Jan ten Compe. His pictures are generally of a small size, and are highly finished, with a good effect of light and shade.

References

 

1724 births
1781 deaths
18th-century Dutch painters
18th-century Dutch male artists
Dutch male painters
Painters from Amsterdam